The British Columbia Securities Commission (BCSC) is a regulatory agency which administers and enforces securities legislation in the Canadian province of British Columbia.

See also
 Canadian securities regulation
 Securities Commission
 Canadian Securities Administrators
 Ontario Securities Commission
 Autorité des marchés financiers (Québec)

References

External links
Official site
About the BCSC

British Columbia law
Crown corporations of British Columbia
Financial regulatory authorities of Canada
British Columbia government departments and agencies